Qusarçay (also, Kusarchay) is a village and municipality in the Khachmaz Rayon of Azerbaijan.  It has a population of 4,776.

References 

Populated places in Khachmaz District